= No Hay Pan =

- Official Movie Poster
- Directed by: Macarena Monrós
- Written by: Pamela Muñoz
- Produced by: Iván Nakouzi
- Starring: Raúl Palma, Marta Méndez
- Cinematography: Mauricio Palacios
- Edited by: Jasmín Valdés
- Music by: Eduardo Ortíz, Martín Pérez
- Release date: August 21, 2012 (Santiago)
- Running time: 19 minutes
- Country: Chile
- Language: Spanish

No Hay Pan is a Chilean short film, directed by Macarena Monrós. The plot deals with issues such as capitalism, modernity, the loss of heritage and traditions. It was produced by Iván Nakouzi and premiered on August 21 of the year 2012, at the Santiago International Film Festival (SANFIC) in Chile. On 24 January 2013 it was internationally premiered at the International Film Festival Rotterdam (IFFR).

No Hay Pan is one of the most awarded Chilean short films of the decade with more than 80 festival selections and awards.

== Plot ==
Luis (Palma, Rául) is the owner of a little grocery store that suffers a sudden downturn when a supermarket sets up in its neighborhood and he is told that he'll no longer be provided with bread. The man faces a crossroads: closing the store, or finding another bread supplier to keep his business open.
